The freshwater snake-eel (Lamnostoma kampeni) is an eel in the family Ophichthidae (worm/snake eels). It was described by Max Carl Wilhelm Weber and Lieven Ferdinand de Beaufort in 1916. It is a tropical, freshwater eel which is known from Asia and Oceania, including New Caledonia, New Guinea, the Philippines, and Vanuatu. Males can reach a maximum total length of 41 centimetres.

References

Ophichthidae
Fish described in 1916